Indoor Kabaddi for the 2013 Asian Indoor and Martial Arts Games was held at the Ansan Sangnoksu Gymnasium. It took place from 29 June to 3 July 2013. Women's indoor kabaddi teams made their debut in these Games, as only the men's teams were allowed to compete for medals at both Macau 2007 and Hanoi 2009 previously.

Medalists

Medal table

Results

Men

Preliminary

Gold medal match

Women

Preliminary

Group A

Group B

Knockout round

Semifinals

Gold medal match

References

External links
Official Website 

2013 Asian Indoor and Martial Arts Games events
2013
Asian